Dave Ogas (born July 23, 1946) is a former American football linebacker. He played for the Oakland Raiders in 1968 and for the Buffalo Bills in 1969.

References

1946 births
Living people
American football linebackers
San Diego State Aztecs football players
Oakland Raiders players
Buffalo Bills players